Paola Fabiana Ponce (born 25 June 1979), known professionally as Lola Ponce, is an Argentine singer and actress.

Ponce made her breakthrough in Argentina and Latin America with her debut album Inalcanzable, which was released in 2001. She also earned a great popularity in Italy, after starring in musical Notre-Dame de Paris in Verona. Ponce has since released two more albums — Fearless (2004) and Il diario di Lola (2008) — and has performed in Spanish, Italian and English. In 2008, along with Giò Di Tonno, she won Sanremo Festival with the song "Colpo di fulmine".
She sings in many Concerts with Andrea Bocelli and Riccardo Cocciante.

Life and career

Early life and career (1982–1997) 
Lola Ponce was born in Rosario, Santa Fe Province, to Hector and María. She has two siblings, Claudia and Alejandro. Born and raised in a musical family, she formed a duo with her brother when she was only eight, performing melodic songs. Ponce took part in many festivals in Latin America as child and teenager. In 1998, she had a role in Chiquititas, a popular TV series created by Cris Morena, and signed a recording contract with producer Oscar Mediavilla in 1999. Ponce entered the University of Buenos Aires, but dropped it to pursue her music career.

Stardom (2001–present) 
Ponce released her debut album Inalcanzable in 2001, achieving a great success in Latin America. In 2002, she was cast as Esméralda in theatre musical Notre-Dame de Paris, which was shown in Verona, Italy, and Barcelona, Spain. Ponce recorded two songs for the musical soundtrack, "Ave Maria Pagana" and "Ali in Gabbia, Occhi Selvaggi", and made her breakthrough in Italy and Europe. In 2004, she released her first album in English, Fearless, and in 2005 performed her song "Sleep" in the revival part of the San Remo Festival.

In 2008, she released third studio albums Il diario di Lola, which contains songs in Spanish, Italian and English. Ponce also won the 58th Sanremo Music Festival along with Giò Di Tonno and the song "Colpo di fulmine". The song reached number one at Italian Singles Chart. In 2010, Ponce appeared in several television series and films, and starred the stage adaptation of Alessandro Manzoni's novel The Betrothed. She also participated in Argentine version of Dancing with the Stars, Bailando por un sueño, and released her first compilation album Lola.

Personal life 
Ponce dated Italian lawyer Manuel Malenotti for five years, from 2005 to 2010.

She began a relationship with her co-star Aarón Díaz in 2012. The pair began dating after meeting on the set of the telenovela El Talisman. They have two daughters: Erin (born February 2013) and Regina (born August 2014). The couple got married in June 2015, in a private ceremony held in Morocco.

Discography 
 2001: Inalcanzable
 2002: Notre-Dame de Paris
 2004: Fearless
 2008: Il diario di Lola
 2010: Lola

Filmography

References

External links 

 

1982 births
Argentine female models
21st-century Argentine women singers
Argentine film actresses
Argentine stage actresses
Argentine telenovela actresses
Argentine television actresses
Place of birth missing (living people)
English-language singers from Argentina
Italian-language singers
Living people
People from San Lorenzo Department
Sony BMG artists
Sanremo Music Festival winners
Bailando por un Sueño (Argentine TV series) participants